Luitré-Dompierre is a commune in the Ille-et-Vilaine department in Brittany in northwestern France. It was established on 1 January 2019 by merger of the former communes of Luitré (the seat) and Dompierre-du-Chemin.

See also
Communes of the Ille-et-Vilaine department

References

Communes of Ille-et-Vilaine
Communes nouvelles of Ille-et-Vilaine
Populated places established in 2019
2019 establishments in France